Anastasia Yuryevna Pozdnyakova (born 11 December 1985) is a Russian diver.  Pozdniakova competed in the 2008 Summer Olympics and won a silver medal with her partner Yulia Pakhalina in the 3m Synchronized Springboard.

Pozdnyakova lives in Houston, Texas, United States and competes for the University of Houston's diving team.  In February 2009, Pozdnyakova won her 11th-career Conference USA Diver of the Week honor, the fifth-most weekly honors won by an athlete in any C-USA sport and the most for any diver in C-USA history.

Currently a redshirt junior, Pozdnyakova has competed on the Houston Cougars diving team since 2004. She is currently coaching at Spring Branch ISD in Houston, TX.

References

External links
 UH Cougars profile 

1985 births
Living people
People from Elektrostal
Russian female divers
Olympic divers of Russia
Divers at the 2008 Summer Olympics
Divers at the 2012 Summer Olympics
Olympic silver medalists for Russia
University of Houston alumni
Olympic medalists in diving
Medalists at the 2008 Summer Olympics
World Aquatics Championships medalists in diving
Sportspeople from Moscow Oblast